"Learn to Love Again" is the fourth single by British pop rock band Lawson, from their debut studio album, Chapman Square. The song was released in the United Kingdom on 3 February 2013, via Polydor Records, and has peaked at number 13 on the UK Singles Chart. The song was written by Rami Yacoub, Carl Falk, Michel Zitron, Andy Brown, Eric Turner and Joakim Berg.

Music video
Directed by Shane Drake, a music video to accompany the release of "Learn to Love Again" was first released onto YouTube on 20 December 2012 at a total length of three minutes and thirty-eight seconds.

Critical reception
Robert Copsey of Digital Spy gave the song a positive review stating:

It's a rousing effort that blends their usual breezy guitar melodies with strobing synths and an anthemic, cooing chorus that places them somewhere between the youthfulness of The Wanted and the hooks of - dare we say - Bon Jovi..

Track listings
 Digital download
 "Learn to Love Again" - 3:24
 "Hurts Like You" - 3:32 (Written by Andy Brown, Ki Fitzgerald, Gary Clark)
 "Learn to Love Again" (Acoustic) - 3:37
 "Waterfall" (Acoustic) - 3:35

Chart performance

Release history

References

2012 songs
2013 singles
Lawson (band) songs
Polydor Records singles
Songs written by Rami Yacoub
Songs written by Carl Falk
Songs written by Joakim Berg
Music videos directed by Shane Drake
Songs written by Eric Turner (singer)
Songs written by Michel Zitron